In the run up to the 2017 general elections in the Netherlands, various organisations carry out opinion polling to gauge voting intention in Netherlands. Results of such polls are displayed in this article.

The date range for these opinion polls are from the previous general election, held on 12 September 2012, to the present day.

Projections

Graphical summary 
The seat projections in the graphs below are continuous from September 2012 (the last general election) up to the current date. Each colored line specifies a political party; numbers on the vertical axis represent numbers of seats. These seat estimates are derived from estimates by Peilingwijzer ("polling indicator") by Tom Louwerse, a professor of political science at Leiden University; they are not strictly polling averages, but the results of a model calculating a "trajectory" for each party based on changes in support over time in between polls conducted by I&O Research, Ipsos, TNS NIPO, LISS panel, Peil, and De Stemming, and adjusting for the house effects of each individual pollster.

Seats 
Poll results are listed in the tables below in reverse chronological order, showing the most recent first. The highest figure in each survey is displayed in bold, and the background shaded in the leading party's colour. In the instance that there is a tie, then both figures are shaded. In contrast with many countries, opinion poll results in the Netherlands are generally reported in terms of the number of seats expected to be won rather than the percentage of the party vote (total is 150). Seat totals from the LISS panel are recorded separately in a section below, as it represents the trends among a static panel and is not a standard poll.

LISS panel

See also
Opinion polling for the next Dutch general election

References

Netherlands
2017